Nazar Bohdanovych Verbnyi (born 26 July 1997) is a Ukrainian professional football midfielder who plays for Ahrobiznes Volochysk.

Club career
Verbnyi is a product of the FC Karpaty Lviv School System. His first trainer was Vasyl Leskiv. He made his debut for FC Karpaty as a main-squad player in a match against FC Chornomorets Odesa on 17 September 2016 in the Ukrainian Premier League.

International career
He also played for Ukraine national under-16 football team.

Personal life
His elder brother Volodymyr Verbnyi is also a football player.

References

External links
 
 

1997 births
Living people
Sportspeople from Lviv
Ukrainian footballers
Association football midfielders
FC Karpaty Lviv players
FC Rukh Lviv players
FC Olimpik Donetsk players
FC Karpaty Halych players
FC Ahrobiznes Volochysk players
Ukrainian Premier League players
Ukrainian First League players
Ukrainian Second League players